First Ukrainian maritime institute  is a private maritime institute, and was founded in 2005 in Sevastopol, Ukraine. The institute is a member of the International Marine Contractors Association and Magna Charta Universitatum.

Forms of training
- Full-time

- Distance

The Institute has all necessary licenses and certificates issued by the Ministry of Education, Youth and Sports, the Ministry of Infrastructure, the Ministry of Social Policy.

Structure of the Institute
There is a unique educational complex, which consists of the following departments:

- Lyceum, entering from a base or a complete general secondary education (without certificate). Upon completion of education is issued a certificate of a qualified employee;

- College, entering from a base on the results of entrance examinations, or complete general secondary education certificates or diplomas / certificates of a qualified worker. Upon graduation received the diploma of junior specialist;

- First Ukrainian Maritime Institute entering on the basis diplomas of junior specialist on senior courses or complete general secondary education certificate;

- Education and training centers for training of crew vessels of various types;

- The Employment Service (crewing company.)

Faculties and areas of training
The Institute has four faculties:

• Navigation;

• Marine energy;

• Tourism, Hotel and Restaurant and the cruise business;

• Transportation Technology and Management,

integrating 10 departments and preparing bachelors in 12 areas, including:
• Sea and river transport;

• Electromechanical

• Transportation technology in maritime transport;

• Business Economics;

• Management;

• Water Bioresources and Aquaculture;

• Philology;

• Hotel and restaurant management;

• Personnel management and labor economics;

• Commodity and trading business;

• Food Technology;

• Tourism,

and specialists (based on the bachelor's degree) in three specialties: navigation, exploitation of marine power plants, traffic organization and management of maritime transport.

References
Official site of the institute
List of universities in Ukraine
Higher education
Higher education in Ukraine

Maritime colleges
Universities in Ukraine